HMAS Korowa was an auxiliary minesweeper operated by the Royal Australian Navy (RAN) during World War II. She was launched in 1919 by Cochrane and Sons Ltd at Selby as Edward McGuire. The ship operated in Australian waters from 1937, and was requisitioned by the RAN in September 1939. She was returned to her owners in 1945 before being scrapped in 1954.

Operational history

St. Lolau was purchased by the Red Funnell Trawler Pty Ltd and sailed to Sydney, Australia in 1937 and was late renamed Korowa. In September 1939, Korowa was requisitioned by the RAN for use as an auxiliary and commissioned on 6 October 1939.

During the war, Korowa was based initially in Melbourne before later operating out of Fremantle with Minesweeping Group 66 and operated along the West Australian coastline. She was returned to her owners in November 1945.

Korowa was broken up in 1954.

Citations

References
 http://www.navyhistory.org.au/06-october-1939/

1919 ships
Minesweepers of the Royal Australian Navy
Fishing ships of Australia
Ships built in Selby